Arcadia station is an at-grade light rail station on the L Line of the Los Angeles Metro Rail system. It is located at the intersection of 1st Avenue and Santa Clara Street in Arcadia, California, after which the station is named.

This station opened on March 5, 2016, as part of Phase 2A of the Foothill Extension project. This station and all the other original Gold Line and Foothill Extension stations will be part of the A Line upon completion of the Regional Connector project in 2023. 

An overpass bridge was constructed over Santa Anita Avenue near the station.

History

Former bridge
In Arcadia, a steel railroad bridge transitioned the Atchison, Topeka and Santa Fe Railway between the I-210 and street grade. This bridge, between Baldwin and Santa Anita, was deemed unsafe following the 1994 Northridge earthquake and removed by Caltrans. The Phase 2A project constructed the "Iconic Freeway Structure or Gold Line Bridge" (IFS), as the replacement bridge. Designed by Minnesota artist Andrew Leicester, the bridge was unveiled in December 2012. Leicester's design was chosen from 17 others in a competitive process. The artist worked with L.A. design consultant AECOM as well as the bridge's builder, Skanska USA, on the final design and construction. The woven-basket look of the bridge's support columns emulate the woven baskets of the native Chumash people of the San Gabriel Valley while the underside of the bridge evokes a Western diamondback rattlesnake.

Former service

Arcadia train station was added two years after the original the Los Angeles and San Gabriel Valley Railroad opened in 1885. The 1887 station was a Queen Anne-style passenger depot on First Avenue. The passenger station was decommissioned in 1951 and relocated in 1970 to the Fairplex, RailGiants Train Museum that is located inside the Los Angeles County Fairgrounds in Pomona. The rail line was operated by the Atchison, Topeka and Santa Fe Railroad (Santa Fe), and served Amtrak's Southwest Chief and Desert Wind, although the latter never stopped at Arcadia. The Santa Fe line served the San Gabriel Valley until 1994, when the 1994 Northridge earthquake weakened the bridge in Arcadia. After the line was decommissioned in 1994, Arcadia became the destination for Metrolink's Rose Bowl train on New Year's Day. In 1996, a Sprinter was run from Arcadia to Monrovia. For an unknown period of time, the station was the home of a private railcar called the Pine Bluff until its purchase in the mid-2000s.

Arcadia train station should not be confused with the Lucky Baldwin's Santa Anita Depot that was a freight depot at Santa Anita Avenue and Colorado Boulevard and moved to the Los Angeles County Arboretum and Botanic Garden in 1970.

The station was formally dedicated in a ceremony held on August 22, 2015. Regular light rail service to the station began on March 5, 2016.

Service

Station layout

Hours and frequency

Connections 
, the following connections are available:
 Los Angeles Metro Bus: , 
 Foothill Transit: , 
 Arcadia Transit: Blue, Green, Red

References

Railway stations in the United States opened in 2016
L Line (Los Angeles Metro) stations
Arcadia, California
2016 establishments in California
Former Atchison, Topeka and Santa Fe Railway stations in California
Pacific Electric stations